Kayan may refer to:

Ethnography 
 Kayan people (Myanmar)
 Padaung language
 Kayan people (Borneo)
 Kayan language (Borneo), dialect cluster spoken in Borneo
 Kayan–Murik languages, group of Austronesian languages that includes the Kayan dialect cluster

Geography 
 Kayan, Baghlan, town in Baghlan Province, Afghanistan
 Kayan, Armenia, town in Armenia
 Kayan, Iran, city in Iran
 Kian, Iran
 Kian, Isfahan, Iran
 Kayan, Ergani

Other 
 Kayan (musician), Indian musician

Language and nationality disambiguation pages